
Laguna Chaplín is a lake in the San Ignacio de Velasco Municipality, José Miguel de Velasco Province, Santa Cruz Department, Bolivia. At an elevation of 190 m, its surface area is 13 km2.

Documentation 

 2017 - Objectif Sauvage - The expedition of three Swiss filmmakers to Laguna Chaplin (French Language, 1h 20 min)

Lakes of Santa Cruz Department (Bolivia)